The Legend of Gator Face is a 1996 Canadian comedy horror feature film written by David Covell, Alan Mruvka, and Sahara Riley, and directed by Vic Sarin.  The film first aired as a Showtime Original Pictures for Kids in May 1996.  In 1997 it was nominated for a Daytime Emmy. The Legend of Gator Face had a theatrical and television release and is now available on DVD.

Plot
Two friends, Danny (John White), and Phil (Dan Warry-Smith) live in a Mississippi town near a swamp. There is a local legend of a swamp-dwelling creature called "Gator Face". They construct a Gator Face costume by modifying a wetsuit.  After scaring most of the townsfolk, the pranks make national news, drawing the attention of the National Guard. Danny soon discovers that Gator Face is real and friendly. After Danny, along with his friends Phil and Angel (Charlotte Sullivan), saves Gator Face from a trap, they realize that Gator Face is protecting the swamps. Danny learns that the National Guard will kill Gator Face if he is caught so the three friends resolve to save the monster. Danny's older brother Chip (Gordon Michael Woolvett) shoots at Danny (while Danny is dressed as Gator Face) with a flare gun and misses when Danny flees into a nearby building. The townsfolk think Danny is the real Gator Face and burns the building with Danny in it, the real Gator Face jumps in and saves Danny but is himself shot. Yet the swamp won't let its defender die, so the fog heals Gator Face and the day is saved.

Cast
 John White as Danny
 Dan Warry-Smith as Phil
 Charlotte Sullivan as Angel
 Gordon Michael Woolvett as Chip
 C. David Johnson as Sheriff
 Paul Winfield as Bob
 Pam Hyatt as Mayor's Wife
 Jack Newman as Porkbelly
 Gerry Quigley as Deputy Dan
 Scott Wickware as Reese
 Roger Dunn as Mayor
 Kathleen Laskey as Danny's Mom
 Sam Malkin as Lydster
 Richard McMillan as Skeeter
 Matt John Evans as Gator Face

Reception
TV Guide wrote that the film was a "blatant rip-off" of E.T., but was "a surprisingly effective children's movie nevertheless."  They wrote that the story had the usual cliche lessons for children toward teaching tolerance, but that it was not "too preachy or heavy-handed" and that "the emphasis is on lighthearted adventure from a child's point-of-view". They noted that the film was a bit lengthy, but that "the direction is competent and the cast is likable".  John J. O'Connor of The New York Times noted that Showtime "strengthened its first-rate record" of providing "innovative, commercial-free family product at dependable times" by its release of The Legend of Gator Face.

Recognition
In 1997 The Legend of Gator Face was nominated for a Daytime Emmy for Paul Winfield for Outstanding Performer in a Children's Special.

Release
Alec to the Rescue, Wild Horses, The Legend of Gatorface, Russkies (4 Disc set) (Jun 7, 2005 Platinum Disc)Legend of Gatorface, Russkies (2 Disc set)(Jun 7, 2005 Platinum Disc)Legend of Gatorface'' (Feb 8, 2005 Platinum Disc)

References

External links
 
 The Legend of Gator Face at All Movie Guide

1996 films
1990s comedy horror films
Canadian children's comedy films
Films based on urban legends
Films directed by Vic Sarin
English-language Canadian films
Canadian comedy horror films
1996 comedy films
1990s English-language films
1990s Canadian films